The New Zealand Football Championship's 2011–12 season (known as the ASB Premiership  for sponsorship reasons) will be the eighth  season of the NZFC since its establishment in 2004. The home and away season will begin on 22 October 2011. Waitakere United and Auckland City will represent the ASB Premiership in the 2011–12 OFC Champions League after finishing Premiers and runners up respectively in the 2009–10 competition.

Clubs
As in the previous season, eight clubs participated in the league.

Stadia and locations

Personnel and kits

League table

Regular season

Round 1

 Due to a breach of player eligibility regulations, the match between Team Wellington and Otago United on 23 October – originally a 2–2 draw –has been awarded as a 2–0 win to Team Wellington.

Round 2

Round 3

Round 4

Round 5

Round 6

Round 7

Round 8

After carefully examining the match footage of the Canterbury United vs YoungHeart Manawatu game, two goals have been reassigned and awarded to different players: 1) the 34th-minute goal credited to Darren White has now been awarded to Joe Murray; and 2) the 56th-minute goal credited to Russel Kamo has now been awarded as an own goal scored by Matt Borren.

Round 9

Round 10

Round 5 Catch Up

Round 11

Round 6 Catch Up

Round 12

Round 13

Round 14

Finals

Semi-finals – first leg

Semi-finals – second leg

Final

Positions by round

 Round 10 positions include the Round 5 catch-up game between Hawkes Bay United and Auckland City

Season statistics

Leading goalscorers
Updated to Round 14

 Goals scored during Round 5 catch up were included in Round 10, and goals scored during Round 6 catch up were included in Round 11

Own goals
Updated to end of Round 11

ASB Premiership Monthly Awards

References

External links
 NZFC Website

New Zealand Football Championship seasons
1
New
New